Cathy Stocker is a current Oklahoma Pardon and Parole Board member and former District Attorney for "Blaine, Canadian, Garfield, Grant and Kingfisher counties" in Oklahoma "for 28 years before retiring in 2010."

Career 
In April 2022, Stocker was chosen to replace Kelly Doyle, who resigned unexpectedly from the board the previous month. Stocker, like another member on the board, Richard Smothermon, is a former-DA, but appointed by Governor Kevin Stitt. The Governor's choice of a former district attorney came "in an election year as Stitt is being accused in TV attack ads of being soft on crime. Many of the ads focus on how many prisoners have been released through commutations recommended by the parole board." Stocker is the only woman on the board. Stocker was appointed to the board at 70 years old, and "has been a member of the Oklahoma Ethics Commission since 2012." She resigned from that position to take the parole board appointment.

When Stocker filed for a seat of retiring in 2010, Smothermon was seeking reelection and Tulsa DA Tim Harris was running unopposed. While district attorney, Stocker served on a task force that developed "various projects to increase awareness of domestic violence issues, to improve enforcement and prosecution of domestic violence laws and to provide services to those who suffer from domestic violence." Stocker and her staff also "implemented a domestic violence prosecution program in Canadian and Garfield Counties" and also "implemented the Garfield County Drug Court." She was "a founding member of the Garfield County Child Advocacy Council" and "an appointed member of the Oklahoma Ethics Commission," serving as chair multiple times. However, Stocker was the District Attorney during the Saundra Kay Medlin case, which was later overturned. Medlin argued battered woman syndrome, was sentenced to four years, but was later exonerated. At the time, Stocker said "her office was 'ready to vigorously pursue [Medlin's] case.'" In 2007, Stocker’s office protested "the early release of 19 of the 22 inmates with convictions in her district seeking clemency from the state Pardon and Parole Board."

At her first pardon and parole board hearing, Stocker did not participate in voting.

See also 

 List of district attorneys by county
 Oklahoma Pardon and Parole Board
 Richard Smothermon 
 Edward J. Konieczny 
 Larry Morris

References 

21st-century American lawyers
Living people
Year of birth missing (living people)
District attorneys in Oklahoma
Oklahoma Republicans